Alex Lacasse is a pop music artist from Ottawa, Ontario, Canada. He attended Sir Wilfrid Laurier high school in Ottawa. Lacasse has a YouTube channel with covers of many current hip hop and pop songs. He has covered Lady Gaga's "Bad Romance", Usher's "OMG", Train's "Hey, Soul Sister", among others. Lacasse attended Fallingbrook Elementary school in Ottawa.

Lacasse visits many schools around Ottawa, performing songs.

Lacasse wrote and released his first single in 2010, titled "Like This, Like That", which had radio play across Canada. It peaked at #31 on the Canadian radio charts.
Lacasse released his second single, "My Girl", to radio in July 2010. A music video was posted by his VEVO channel November 8, 2010. Another video has not been posted nor has a single been released since, but Lacasse continues with his aspirations to become successful as a pop artist. Lacasse also writes for other musical artists. Lacasse co-wrote the lead single "Over You" for the American girl group "Girlicious". It peaked at 15 on the Canadian radio charts.

In December 2014, Lacasse along with Kellen Pomeranz, and Elof Loelv wrote "Velvet" which was performed by Chris Jamison on The Voice season 7 finale. The song peaked at #3 on iTunes, and has since sold over 100,000 digital downloads. Velvet peaked at #53 on the Billboard Hot 100 chart.

References

 Billboard chart
 Hot 100 Chart Moves: Nicki Minaj Passes Madonna, ‘Voice’ Finalists Debut Billboard

Year of birth missing (living people)
Living people
Place of birth missing (living people)
Canadian pop singers
Canadian pop pianists
Canadian male singers
Musicians from Ottawa
Universal Music Group artists
Canadian male pianists
21st-century Canadian pianists
21st-century Canadian male musicians